Rhaphiocerina is a genus of flies in the family Stratiomyidae.

Species
Rhaphiocerina chinensis Li, Yang & Zhang, 2016
Rhaphiocerina hakiensis Matsumura, 1916

References

Stratiomyidae
Brachycera genera
Taxa named by Erwin Lindner
Diptera of Asia